Jimmy B. Lord (March 24, 1936 – October 14, 2015) was an American politician in the state of Georgia.

Lord is an alumnus of the John A. Gupton College, a mortuary science school in Nashville, Tennessee. He is a funeral director (self employed) and businessman. He served in the Georgia House of Representatives from 1977 to 2008. He married Fronie McCoy and has two children.

He died on October 14, 2015, in Washington County.

References

|-

|-

|-

|-

1936 births
2015 deaths
Living people
Georgia (U.S. state) Democrats
21st-century American politicians